This page provides supplementary chemical data on barium chloride.

Material Safety Data Sheet  
SIRI
Science Stuff (Dihydrate)

Structure and properties

Thermodynamic properties

Spectral data

References 

Chemical data pages
Chemical data pages cleanup